A meterstick, metrestick, or yardstick is either a straightedge or foldable ruler used to measure length, and is especially common in the construction industry. They are often made of wood or plastic, and often have metal or plastic joints so that they can be folded together. Normal length of a meterstick made for the international market is either one or two meters, while a yardstick made for the U.S. market is typically one yard (3 feet or 0.9144 meters) long.

Metersticks are usually divided with lines for each millimeter (1000 per meter) and numerical markings per centimeter (100 per meter), with numbers either in centi- or millimeter. Yardsticks are most often marked with a scale in inches, but sometimes also feature marks for foot increments. Hybrid sticks with more than one measurement system also exist, most notably those which have metric measurements on one side and U.S. customary units on the other side (or both on the same side). The "tumstock" (literally "thumbstick", meaning "inch-stick") invented in 1883 by the Swedish engineer Karl-Hilmer Johansson Kollén was the first such hybrid stick, and was developed with the goal to help Sweden convert to the metric system.

Construction
Metersticks are often thin and rectangular, and made of wood or metal. Metal ones are often backed with a 'grippy' material, such as cork, to improve friction. They are relatively cheap, with most wood models costing under US$5.

Measurements

In countries in which the metric system is used, hybrid sticks bearing imperial units markings on one side (three feet  in with inch and fractional inch) and metric units on the other (one meter with 100 centimeters and 1000 millimeters) are common, and are sometimes referred to as yardsticks, metersticks or "meter rulers". The spelling meter vs metre varies by country. Sometimes the imperial units are not included.

Although not used as often, metersticks can be found in the United States. For example, they are common in schools where there is a desire for students to become familiar with metric units. They may also be used in American science labs.

The folding carpenters' rulers used in Scandinavia are sometimes equipped with double measurements, metric and imperial on both sides, also functioning as a handy conversion table, accounting for its Scandinavian term: Tommestokk/tumstock (thumb (inch) stick), a term with the same meaning that is also used in Dutch: duimstok. Metric only carpenter's rulers are however common.

Application
The meterstick is usually employed for work on a medium scale; larger than desktop work on paper, yet smaller than large scale infrastructure work, where tape measures or longer measuring rods are used. Typical applications of metersticks are for building furniture, vehicles and houses. Modern carpenters' metersticks are usually made to be folded for ease of transport.

Metersticks may be used as pointing devices for posters and projections. Metersticks are also used as spars to make wings for remote controlled model aircraft that are made from corrugated plastic.

Metre sticks have also been used as a method of corporal punishment in schools in the United Kingdom used to slap the palms of students to bring them in order.

References

External links

Length, distance, or range measuring devices